Alberto Fernández (born Madrid, 16 June 1983) is a Spanish trap shooter. He competes in Trap Shooting and Olympic pit, being triple world champion in the years 2010, 2013 and 2018.

He has won three gold medals at the World Shooting Championships, between 2010 and 2018, and five medals at the European Shooting Championships, between 2006 and 2015.

He competed in four Summer Olympics, winning the gold medal in the mixed trap team event at the 2020 Summer Olympics in Tokyo, in team with Fátima Gálvez. In the individual trap event, he was 33rd in Beijing 2008, 25th in London 2012, 17th in Rio de Janeiro 2016, and 9th in Tokyo.

International Achievements

References

External links
Alberto Fernández at the International Shooting Sport Federation

1983 births
Living people
Spanish male sport shooters
Olympic shooters of Spain
Trap and double trap shooters
Shooters at the 2008 Summer Olympics
Shooters at the 2012 Summer Olympics
Shooters at the 2016 Summer Olympics
Sportspeople from Madrid
European Games competitors for Spain
Shooters at the 2015 European Games
Shooters at the 2019 European Games
Shooters at the 2020 Summer Olympics
Medalists at the 2020 Summer Olympics
Olympic medalists in shooting
Olympic gold medalists for Spain
21st-century Spanish people